Um Ki-joon (born March 23, 1976) is a South Korean actor.

Career
Um Ki-joon made his acting debut in 1995 in the stage play Richard III, though he later became best known as a musical theatre actor, starring in Singin' in the Rain, The Sorrows of Young Werther, Grease, The Three Musketeers, Jack the Ripper, The Count of Monte Cristo, Catch Me If You Can, and Rebecca. He also appeared in the Patrick Marber play Closer.

Um's popularity increased after he began playing supporting roles in television dramas such as Life Special Investigation Team, Worlds Within, Hero, Dream High, Scent of a Woman and Phantom. He was also the leading actor in Good Job, Good Job and The Virus.

Um played the villain in his first film Man of Vendetta, opposite Kim Myung-min. This was followed by a role as Lee Ki-cheol, a detective investigating serial murders in horror film Killer Toon, opposite Lee Si-young.

In 2017, Um played the villain in the hit legal thriller Innocent Defendant.

In 2018, he reunited with the director and writer of Innocent Defendant in medical drama Heart Surgeons.

In 2020, he appeared in TV series The Penthouse: War in Life as Joo Dan-tae, the main villain and a scheming real estate genius. The series aired on SBS TV from October 26.

In 2021, Um signed a contract with Your Entertainment. It was founded by a manager who has been with him since his debut.

Filmography

Film

Television series

Web series

Television show

Music video

Theater

Awards and nominations

References

External links
 
 
 

South Korean male musical theatre actors
South Korean male stage actors
South Korean male television actors
South Korean male film actors
1976 births
Living people
21st-century South Korean male actors